Jürgen Schütz (1 July 1939 – 19 March 1995) was a German professional footballer who played as a midfielder. He spent four seasons in the Bundesliga with 1860 Munich and Borussia Dortmund. Schütz also represented Germany in six friendlies. He died of laryngeal cancer.

Honours
Borussia Dortmund
 Bundesliga: 1963
 DFB-Pokal: runner-up 1963

External links
 
 

1939 births
1995 deaths
Footballers from Dortmund
German footballers
Association football midfielders
Germany international footballers
Bundesliga players
Serie A players
Borussia Dortmund players
A.S. Roma players
A.C.R. Messina players
Torino F.C. players
Brescia Calcio players
TSV 1860 Munich players
German expatriate footballers
German expatriate sportspeople in Italy
Expatriate footballers in Italy